Dharshibhai Lakhabhai Khanpura (died 3 November 2020) was an Indian politician from Gujarat.

Biography
Darshibhai Khanpura was a native of Vada village in Banaskantha district of Gujarat. He had studied till grade 4.

Khanpura served as a member of the Gujarat Legislative Assembly representing the Kankrej constituency four times. He was firstly elected to assembly in 1990 as a member of Janata Dal followed by in 1995, 2002 and 2012 as a member of Indian National Congress. He won in the 2012 election with the lead of only 600 votes.

Khanpura contracted COVID-19 and was transported to the U. N. Mehta Hospital in Ahmedabad. On 3 November 2020, he succumbed to his death at the age of 80.

References

2020 deaths
Deaths from the COVID-19 pandemic in India
Indian National Congress politicians from Gujarat
People from Banaskantha district
Janata Dal politicians
Gujarat MLAs 1990–1995
Gujarat MLAs 1995–1998
Gujarat MLAs 2002–2007
Gujarat MLAs 2012–2017